Linda Rich (born 1949) is an American documentary photographer. With Elinor Cahn and Joan Clark Netherwood, she was a founder and active participant in the East Baltimore Documentary Survey Project between 1975 and 1980. Her work is included in the collections of the Smithsonian American Art Museum and the Art Institute of Chicago.

References

Living people
1949 births
Artists from Cleveland
Documentary photographers
20th-century American women artists
21st-century American women artists
20th-century American photographers
21st-century American photographers
Photographers from Ohio
Artists in the Smithsonian American Art Museum collection
Women photojournalists
20th-century American women photographers
21st-century American women photographers